Ogcocephalus pantostictus, the spotted batfish, is a species of fish in the anglerfish genus in the batfish family Ogcocephalidae.

The fish is found in the Western Atlantic Ocean, somewhat restricted to the northern and the western Gulf of Mexico.

References

Ogcocephalidae
Taxa named by Margaret G. Bradbury
Fish described in 1980